Sinton is a city in and the county seat of San Patricio County, Texas, United States. The population was 5,665 at the 2010 census. It was founded in 1886 and was named in honor of David Sinton, a influential business owner and rancher.

Geography

Sinton is located at  (28.034824, –97.508942).

According to the United States Census Bureau, the city has a total area of 2.2 square miles (5.7 km), all land.

Climate

The climate in this area is characterized by hot, humid summers and generally mild to cool winters. Sinton has a humid subtropical climate, Cfa  according to the Köppen climate classification system.

Demographics

2020 census

As of the 2020 United States census, there were 5,504 people, 1,756 households, and 1,199 families residing in the city.

2010 census
As of the census of 2010,  5,723 people, 1,845 households, and 1,409 families resided in the city. The population density was 2,582.0 people per square mile (996.1/km). The 2,026 housing units averaged 921.6 per square mile (355.6/km). The racial makeup of the city was 73.47% White, 3.63% African American, 0.93% Native American, 0.04% Asian, 0.09% Pacific Islander, 18.48% from other races, and 3.37% from two or more races. Hispanics of any race were 71.04% of the population.

Of the 1,845 households, 39.3% had children under the age of 18 living with them, 50.8% were married couples living together, 18.9% had a female householder with no husband present, and 23.6% were not families. About 21.4% of all households were made up of individuals, and 11.5% had someone living alone who was 65 years of age or older. The average household size was 2.89 and the average family size was 3.35.

In the city, the population was distributed as 30.0% under the age of 18, 10.0% from 18 to 24, 27.2% from 25 to 44, 19.3% from 45 to 64, and 13.5% who were 65 years of age or older. The median age was 32 years. For every 100 females, there were 100.6 males. For every 100 females age 18 and over, there were 96.3 males.

The median income for a household in the city was $27,911, and for a family was $32,266. Males had a median income of $25,331 versus $17,163 for females. The per capita income for the city was $12,881. About 22.4% of families and 28.0% of the population were below the poverty line, including 38.3% of those under age 18 and 21.8% of those age 65 or over.

History
Sinton was established in 1895 as a station on the San Antonio and Aransas Pass Railroad, and the seat of San Patricio County was moved there from San Patricio later that year.

In 1954 the Welder Wildlife Refuge was established on 7800 acres approximately seven miles north-west of Sinton.

Education
The City of Sinton is served by the Sinton Independent School District.

Sports

From 1948 to 1958, Sinton was the home to the Plymouth Oilers, a semiprofessional baseball team sponsored by Plymouth Oil Company, which had extensive drilling operations on the Welder Ranch, north of the city.  The team hired star college players for the summer and gave them jobs in the field, gas plant, and office. Experienced players were hired on a permanent basis.  By 1950, the Oilers were playing a 46-game schedule, going 33–13 and placing fourth in the National Baseball Congress national, semipro tournament.  In 1951, the Oilers returned to the national championship after winning the state title in Oiler Park before a record crowd of 2,304.  At the national tournament in Wichita against the Camp Pickett (Virginia) Red Wings, Oiler pitcher Mike Blyzka turned in a no-hit, no-run game (5–0), the second in tournament history. The Oilers then defeated Atwater (California) 3–0 to win the national championship, the first Texas team to do so,  They returned to nationals in 1952, 1954, 1955, 1956, and 1957, placing second in 1955. In 1957, the National Baseball Congress declared Sinton, Texas, the premier city in the nation, per capita, for promoting semipro baseball for nearly a decade. In the spring of 1958, the Plymouth Oil Company, citing economic conditions, ended its support of the Oilers, and the team disbanded.

References

Further reading
 

Cities in the Corpus Christi metropolitan area
Cities in San Patricio County, Texas
Cities in Texas
County seats in Texas